Justiniano Asuncion (September 26, 1816 – 1901), also known as Capitan Ting, was a Filipino painter.

Background
Asuncion was one of the leading Filipino painters in the 19th century. In 1834, he studied at Escuela de Dibujo, where he obtained his skills in painting. Sometime in 1855, he became capitan municipal of Santa Cruz, Manila. Asuncion was the painter of the famous Coronation of the Virgin, the Virgin of Antipolo, Filomena Asuncion, and Romana A. Carillo. He produced life-sized paintings of San Agustin, San Geronimo, San Antonio, and San Gregorio Magno which were kept at the Santa Cruz Church before the World War II. These precious canvases were destroyed when the Japanese bombarded the church in February 1945. His works mirror the mannerism of that period – the first 75 years of the 19th century. The portraitists of those time carefully delineated features of the head; the hands and other minor details with linear accuracy; usually disregarding tonal values and emphasizing hardness of effect. The University of Santo Tomas Museum owns one of Asuncion’s paintings, dated February 1862. An unsigned portrait of Fr. Melchor Garcia de Sampedro at the UST Museum is said to be the work of Asuncion. Most of his other works are kept as national treasures at the Central Bank of the Philippines and the Philippines Museum. On September 12, 1983, at the façade of Santa Cruz Church in Manila, a marker was installed in his honor. He died in 1901 at age of 85.

Works

See also 
Damián Domingo
José Honorato Lozano
Letras y figuras
Juan Luna
Fernando Amorsolo
Fabián de la Rosa
Félix Resurrección Hidalgo
Tipos del Pais
Boxer Codex

References 

1816 births
1901 deaths
Filipino painters